Karyn Marshall (born April 2, 1956 in Miami, Florida) is an American Olympic weightlifter who won the first women's world championship in weightlifting, held in 1987. She became a chiropractor and runs a private practice in Shrewsbury, New Jersey while battling breast cancer since 2011. In 2011, Marshall was inducted into the USA Weightlifting Hall of Fame, and she was inducted into the International Weightlifting Hall of Fame in 2015.

Early years
Marshall was born in a Miami hospital in 1956 and grew up in Coral Gables, Florida. Her family moved to Bronxville, New York in the 1960s. She attended Bronxville High School and excelled in field hockey (she was goalie) and basketball (center), graduating in 1974, and she also competed in tennis and track. She earned a bachelor of science in nursing degree from Columbia University in 1980 and was a Dean's List student. She worked as a nurse for six months but changed her mind saying there "were a lot of frustrations." She worked as a financial analyst at the Wall Street brokerage firm of P. R. Herzig and Company for ten years.

Career
Marshall began training in 1978. She was coached by talented weightlifters such as Arthur Drechsler and Mark Chasnov. Generally in the 1970s there were no local, national or international competitions for women weightlifters, and women's weightlifting was not seen so much as a legitimate sport but more as a "freak show". She commented in Sports Illustrated in 1987 that "people think women weightlifters are squat and muscle-bound, with all the intelligence of amoebas".

But in the 1980s and in subsequent decades, women's athletics were becoming more prominent. Marshall's first competition was the qualifying meet for the 1979 Empire State Games in White Plains, New York. She won her first national championship in 1981. During the 1980s, Marshall won her weight class six times out of seven and set 45 national records. In 1983, Marshall learned from men's coach Mark LeMenager that the women's weightlifting record had been set 75 years earlier when circus performer Katie Sandwina lifted  overhead; according to Drechsler, the Sandwina record inspired Marshall to work harder. Her training regimen included "more squatting, pressing and other strength building exercises." In 1984, she made it into the Guinness Sports Record Book with a  clean and jerk, an Olympic event featuring a two-stage lift of a barbell above one's head. This lift topped the Sandwina record. In 1984, she was recognized as the world record holder for women's weightlifting in the 82.5 kg category, based on her results from a competition in Florida. In 1985, Marshall lifted  in the clean-and-jerk lift. In 1987, the first year in which there was a world championship for women in weightlifting, Marshall competed for the United States against a surprisingly strong team from China. She not only won her bodyweight category by  but she outlifted all athletes in the unlimited bodyweight category. She made the highest total in the competition to earn the title of World's Strongest Woman. The Guinness Sports Record Book credited her as being the "world's most powerful female" because of her lifting  overhead. She won the International Weightlifting Federation (IWF) World Championship. She was described as the "top American finisher" in the  pound weight class. She said:

She married Peter Marshall in 1987. In 1988, she was listed in the New York Times roster of champions for women's weightlifting in the  category. She won silver medals in international competitions—Jakarta (1988), Manchester (1989) and Sarajevo (1990). She was viewed by officials of women's weightlifting as a representative for the sport, and Mary Ann Rinehart described her as a "fantastic spokesperson" who "represents the true meaning of the amateur athlete." In 1999, Marshall won a gold medal in the open division middle heavyweight division (+75 kg or +165¼ pounds). She is an eight‑time United States Weightlifting Federation (USWF) champion and New York State record holder for the United States Powerlifting Federation (USPF). She is the first woman in history to snatch over 200 pounds. A snatch is the other Olympic event in which a barbell is raised from a platform to locked arms overhead in a smooth continuous movement, pulled as high as possible, typically to mid chest height.

In 1991, in a send-off of the United States team to the Olympics, Marshall set "Festival records for the snatch (198 1/4), clean and jerk (264 1/2) and total (462 3/4) at 181 3/4 pounds." By 1991, she had won a total of one world championship (1987), 63 American records, and 8 world records. She appeared on The Oprah Winfrey Show, the Joan Rivers Show, ESPN, CNN, and various other prime time news and sports broadcasts. In 2011, she became a coach at CrossFit in Shrewsbury, New Jersey.

Marshall began studying to be a chiropractor at Northeast College of Health Sciences based on her successful experiences as a patient. She attributed much of her success in weightlifting to chiropractic because it steered her away from painkillers and towards drug-free and non-surgical forms of treatment and prevention, she said in an interview. She explained her decision to become a chiropractor allowed her to "stay involved in health and fitness, while at the same time being able to use my knowledge and experience to help other people."

During these years, Marshall continued to compete in weightlifting events; in 2006, competing at age 50, she set three records in the women’s 50–54 category. The first two records came in the snatch and clean and jerk events, and her total of  set a record. She also was described as having bench-pressed , and made a "475 pound [215 kg] dead lift".

References

External links
 Karyn Marshall lifting 303 pounds
 Champion Chiropractic website
 TED talk 2015

1956 births
Living people
Olympic weightlifters of the United States
American chiropractors
American people of Norwegian descent
Columbia University School of Nursing alumni
People from Bronxville, New York
Sportspeople from Coral Gables, Florida
American female weightlifters
New York Chiropractic College alumni
21st-century American women